Panticosa-Los Lagos, officially called Aramón Panticosa, is a ski resort situated  near the town of Panticosa in the upper Tena Valley of the western Pyrenees (province of Huesca, Spain).

The resort
It has 34 km of marked pistes, being one of the most familiar resorts of the Pyrenees. The highest point is Sabocos peak, 2200 m AMSL, with a vertical drop of 850 m.

The base of the resort is the town of Panticosa, which includes several hotels and apartments and is situated at 1350 m AMSL. From there a  gondola lift provides the main access for the resort. The resort itself occupies two different high mountain valleys, defining two sectors: Petrosos and Sabocos. The upper Sabocos valley is accessed by a fast 4 seat chair lift.

Lifts
Many of the resort's lifts are modern and of high capacity but some are obsolete though the resort is continuously improving them, the resort has:

 1 gondola lift.
 6 chair lifts.
 5 ski tows.
 3 magic carpet lifts.

Pistes
The resort offers 38 pistes of different difficulties:

 4 beginners.
  14 easy.
  16 intermediate.
  4 expert.

Services

 1 restaurant.
 1 skiing school.
 1 snow gardens for children.
 1 kindergarten
 1 ski hiring stores.

External links
 http://www.panticosa-loslagos.com - Official resort site.

Ski areas and resorts in Aragon
Pyrenees